The 1960 United States House of Representatives elections in Virginia were held on November 8, 1960 to determine who will represent the Commonwealth of Virginia in the United States House of Representatives. Virginia had ten seats in the House, apportioned according to the 1950 United States Census. Representatives are elected for two-year terms.

Overview

References

See also
 1960 United States House of Representatives elections

Virginia
1960
1960 Virginia elections